Stephens is an unincorporated community in Elliott County, Kentucky, United States.  It lies along Routes 409 and 486 northeast of the city of Sandy Hook, the county seat of Elliott County.  Its elevation is 628 feet (208 m).

References

Unincorporated communities in Elliott County, Kentucky
Unincorporated communities in Kentucky